Wheatland is a historic plantation house located at Callao, Northumberland County, Virginia.  It was built between 1848 and 1850, and consists of a -story, five-bay, Federal style frame main block flanked by symmetrical -story wings.  It measures 96 feet long, and is topped by a gable roof.  The front and rear facades features two-tier Doric order porticos. Also on the property are the contributing kitchen (c. 1848–1850), office (c. 1848–1850), North Yard and South Yard houses (c. 1848–1850), barn (late-19th / early-20th century), tenant house (c. 1920–1935), and early 20th century smokehouse.

It was listed on the National Register of Historic Places in 1988.

References

Plantation houses in Virginia
Houses on the National Register of Historic Places in Virginia
Federal architecture in Virginia
Greek Revival houses in Virginia
Houses completed in 1850
Houses in Northumberland County, Virginia
National Register of Historic Places in Northumberland County, Virginia